Wilder Andrés Guisao Correa (born 30 July 1991) is a Colombian professional footballer who plays as a right winger for Unión Magdalena.

Honours 
Atlético Nacional
 Categoría Primera A (3): 2013–I, 2013–II, 2014–I
 Copa Colombia (2): 2012, 2013
 Superliga Colombiana (1): 2012

External links 
 

1991 births
Living people
Colombian footballers
Colombian expatriate footballers
Bogotá FC footballers
Atlético Nacional footballers
Deportivo Toluca F.C. players
São Paulo FC players
Racing Club de Avellaneda footballers
Chiapas F.C. footballers
Cúcuta Deportivo footballers
Jaguares de Córdoba footballers
Categoría Primera A players
Categoría Primera B players
Campeonato Brasileiro Série A players
Liga MX players
Argentine Primera División players
Association football wingers
Colombian expatriate sportspeople in Mexico
Colombian expatriate sportspeople in Brazil
Colombian expatriate sportspeople in Argentina
Expatriate footballers in Mexico
Expatriate footballers in Brazil
Expatriate footballers in Argentina
People from Apartadó
Sportspeople from Antioquia Department